BRM Government Law College is a government law school situated at L. N. Bezbaruah Road, Panjabari in Guwahati in the Indian state of Assam. It offers 5 Year integrated B.A. LL.B. and LL.M. course affiliated to Gauhati University. This College is recognised by Bar Council of India (BCI), New Delhi.

BRM Government Law College offers both undergraduate and postgraduate courses in law. The undergraduate course offered is a Bachelor of Laws (LLB) program, which is a three-year full-time course. 

The college also offers a five-year integrated course, which is a combination of a Bachelor of Arts (BA) degree and LLB degree. The postgraduate course offered is a Master of Laws (LLM) program, which is a two-year full-time course.

History
BRM Government Law College was established in 1914. Manik Chandra Baruah proposed to British Government in 1903 to establish a law college in Assam. It is the premiere institution for legal studies in Northeast India which was initially named after Sir Archdale Earle, the then Chief Commissioner of Assam in British India. Latter it was named after Bishnuram Medhi, a freedom fighter and Indian politician. Famous writer and scholar Jnanadabhiram Barua was the first principal of this college. From 1914 to 1947, the college was under the Calcutta University. In 1948 it came under the jurisdiction of Gauhati University.

References

Law schools in Assam
Educational institutions established in 1914
1914 establishments in India
Colleges affiliated to Gauhati University
Universities and colleges in Guwahati